Henry J. Arnold, not to be confused with Henry H. Arnold, was an American politician who served as the 27th mayor of Denver, Colorado from 1912 to 1913.

References

Mayors of Denver
Year of death missing
1866 births
People from Clinton, Missouri